Herbert Lewis "Bert" Turner (17 February 1899 – 21 December 1953) was an English professional footballer who could play in any of the forward positions.

Turner was born in Smethwick and played for Darlaston before joining Birmingham on the resumption of competitive football after the First World War. He joined Merthyr Town in 1920 for their first season in the Football League and went on to play 125 league games, scoring 34 goals for the Welsh side. From 1922 to 1924, he was joined in the forward line by Ernest Turner, to whom he was not related.

In 1924 he returned to the Midlands, joining Coventry City, but left after 30 league games to play for non-league Brierley Hill Alliance. He joined Torquay United in 1927 and played in their first match in the Football League, scoring a penalty in a 1–1 draw with local rivals Exeter City at Plainmoor on 27 August 1927.

He missed just four games that season, but left at the end of it, joining Bristol Rovers before rejoining Brierley Hill Alliance and later playing for Standard Athletic.

References

1899 births
1953 deaths
Sportspeople from Smethwick
Association football forwards
English footballers
Darlaston Town F.C. players
Birmingham City F.C. players
Merthyr Town F.C. players
Coventry City F.C. players
Brierley Hill Alliance F.C. players
Torquay United F.C. players
Bristol Rovers F.C. players
English Football League players